Malaysian underground music and idealism is popular locally and overseas. Malaysian youth are typically into the punk culture (including hardcore and its other subgenre). This reflect in the music that they write (band/musician). Most of the Malaysian rock music scene started in Terengganu which has a thriving punk/hardcore scene.

Punk Rock

Late 1980s
Some early Malaysian punk bands called Mallaria; around year 1986 in the city of Kuala Terengganu on 1987 released a four-song demo mix, of which the genre has been described as crossover thrash. The band never released an album on a major label but their drummer went on to form another side-project band called The Stone Crows, and their guitarist participating (without ever recording anything) in various bands such as PROV, DPSA, and Zink. Bands from this early period had a considerable impact on the local punk scene... Their existence rely on a very limited mainstream success.

Early 1990s
During early 1990, the underground punk rock scene in Malaysia was first encountered in Kuala Lumpur. Bands which are currently popular in the meantime such as The Pilgrims, Carburetor Dung, The Bollocks, Formation Bee, Stoink, The United Color Of Frustration, Marlinspike, Mechanical-Baby and A.R.T were playing in the underground gig circuit during this period, along with the other bands from different musical genres. The Oi! scene made a popular trend including the streetpunk bands such as A.C.A.B., The Official and Roots 'n' Boots They adopted the style of mods and skinheads subcultures. This time period was a blend of different music genres and diverse cultures (often reviewed in Joe Kidd's of Carburetor Dung reviews column 'Blasting Concept').

Middle 1990s To late 2000s
However, since the mid 1990 and onwards, plenty of punk rock music have emerged. Music showcase and events were held frequently. Though most Malaysian rock bands have a tendency to sing in English, lately more bands have begun singing in their native language, Bahasa Malaysia. Contemporary bands such as OAG, Butterfingers, MARIONEXXES, Estranged, Pop Shuvit, Bunkface, and Paku have all become popular not only in Malaysia, but also in Indonesia (since Indonesian rock bands and their sound of music had previously greatly influenced the Malaysian market), Singapore, and Japan, due to their frequent collaboration with internationally renowned artists. Pop Shuvit in particular had achieved tremendous success in Japan with three successful headlining tours as well as a Top 20 album sales charting at Tower Records. Another genre to emerge in Malaysia was "sambarock"; pioneered by Darkkey Nagaraja and his band The Keys, it combines hard rock with elements of folkloric Tamil music and a stage presence inspired by Michael Jackson.

Hardcore / Post-Hardcore / Metalcore / Speed Metal
Notable hardcore bands nowadays including Devilica, Kias Fansuri, and Second Combat has been verified as a potential provoke in the underground music industry. Since the early millennium, Metalcore became popular in Malaysia as well with renowned underground bands such as Forsaken, Foreground Division, Groundless Victim, Beyond Sight, Groundrule, Amarah, Dewata, Furion Escalada, Dominator (early), Tyrant (screamo), Dead Eyes Glow, Mad Monsters Attack, Restraint and LoveMeButch (post-hardcore) supporting the local scene.

Rock / Post-Rock
Notable rock groups include Crossing Boundaries (rock), Hujan (indie rock), Moi Last Von (post-rock), Meet Uncle Hussain (prog-rock), Grey Sky Morning (newly formed), The Endleaves (rock), Deepset (post-rock) and Maxim Smirnov (post-rock) emerged in the scenes. Among all the possibility, many names are not being exposed due to the majority of indie label in the centuries.

See also
Music of Malaysia

References

Rock music by country
Malaysian music